Piper's Pool (or Pipers Pool) is a hamlet in east Cornwall, England, UK. It is on the A395 road about 5½ miles west of Launceston.

References

Hamlets in Cornwall